The Upper Deerfield Township Schools are a community public school district that serves students in pre-kindergarten through eighth grade from Upper Deerfield Township, in Cumberland County, New Jersey, United States.

As of the 2020–21 school year, the district, comprised of three schools, had an enrollment of 820 students and 83.2 classroom teachers (on an FTE basis), for a student–teacher ratio of 9.9:1.

The district is classified by the New Jersey Department of Education as being in District Factor Group "B", the second-lowest of eight groupings. District Factor Groups organize districts statewide to allow comparison by common socioeconomic characteristics of the local districts. From lowest socioeconomic status to highest, the categories are A, B, CD, DE, FG, GH, I and J.

Public school students in ninth through twelfth grades attend Cumberland Regional High School, which also serves students from Deerfield Township, Fairfield Township, Greenwich Township, Hopewell Township, Shiloh Borough and Stow Creek Township. As of the 2020–21 school year, the high school had an enrollment of 1,032 students and 78.5 classroom teachers (on an FTE basis), for a student–teacher ratio of 13.1:1.

Schools
Schools in the district (with 2020–21 enrollment data from the National Center for Education Statistics) are:
Elementary schools
Charles F. Seabrook School with 325 students in grades PreK-3)
Dr. Peter Koza, Principal
Elizabeth E. Moore School with 228 students in grades 4-5
Stephen Wilchensky, Principal
Middle school
Woodruff School with 260 students in grades 6-8
Harold Hill, Principal

Administration
Core members of the district's administration are:
Dr. Peter L. Koza, Superintendent
Dr. Frank Badessa, Interim Business Administrator / Board Secretary

Board of education
The district's board of education is comprised of nine members who set policy and oversee the fiscal and educational operation of the district through its administration. As a Type II school district, the board's trustees are elected directly by voters to serve three-year terms of office on a staggered basis, with three seats up for election each year held (since 2012) as part of the November general election. The board appoints a superintendent to oversee the district's day-to-day operations and a business administrator to supervise the business functions of the district.

References

External links
Upper Deerfield Township Schools
 
School Data for the Upper Deerfield Township Schools, National Center for Education Statistics
Cumberland Regional High School

Upper Deerfield Township, New Jersey
New Jersey District Factor Group B
School districts in Cumberland County, New Jersey